Bacioucoto-Conboly is a village in Senegal, located in the Bignona Department of the Ziguinchor Region in the Basse Casamance area of south-west Senegal. At the census if 2002 its population was 59 inhabitants in 8 households.

References

Populated places in the Bignona Department
Arrondissement of Sindian